Philip Rode Houm (20 April 1911 – 22 April 1990) was a Norwegian literary critic.

Biography
He was born in Kristiania (now Oslo), Norway. He graduated  with a master's degree in literature from the Royal Frederick University in 1938, Houm was a co-editor in the journal Kølen 1942-45. He worked as literary critic for the newspaper Dagbladet from 1945.

He was a board member of Nationaltheatret from 1963, a member of Norwegian Language Committee (Norsk språknemnd)  from 1966 to 1972, and of the Norwegian Language Council from 1972 to 1976.

In 1947, he was commissioned by Aschehoug to write a closing volume to their series on Norwegian literature history.  Norges litteratur fra 1914 til 1950-årene was published in 1955.
Among his other books were Ask Burlefot og vi (1957) and Kritikere i en gullalder (1982).

Houm died in Bærum and was buried in the churchyard of Haslum Church. He was a grandfather of Nicolai Houm.

References

1911 births
1990 deaths
Writers from Oslo
University of Oslo alumni
Norwegian literary critics
Norwegian literary historians
Dagbladet people
20th-century Norwegian historians